Lake Siriu is an artificial dam lake in Romania, on the Buzău River valley. Construction of the dam started in 1982, and the 42 MW Nehoiașu hydroelectric plant was opened in 1994.

External links

Hydroelectric power stations in Romania
Lakes of Romania
Reservoirs in Romania
Geography of Buzău County